Łęgowo  is a village in the administrative district of Gmina Kisielice, within Iława County, Warmian-Masurian Voivodeship, in northern Poland.

The village has a population of 690.

History
The village was first settled by Polish people, and its name is of Polish origin. It was devastated during the Thirteen Years' War (1454–1466).

References

Villages in Iława County